Ameriyeh or El Amiriye is a village in northern Aleppo Governorate, northwestern Syria. In the 2004 census, Ameriyeh had a population of 881.

References

Populated places in al-Bab District